Molodaya Gvardiya (lit. Young Guard) is an open joint-stock Russian publishing house, one of the oldest publishers in Russia, having been founded in 1922 during the Soviet era. From 1938 until 1992, it was responsible for publishing the magazine Vokrug sveta (literally: "Around the World").

History 

1922 — The Molodaya Gvardiya publishing and printing association was founded in Moscow on the initiative of the Central Committee of the Komsomol on October 10th. In the first year of the publishing house's operation, 71 books were published with a circulation of 584,000 copies.

1930s — The publishing house began to produce not only books, but also newspaper and magazine products. 

In 1968, Soviet pilot and cosmonaut Yuri Gagarin signed for the printing of his book Psychology and Space, written in collaboration with Vladimir Lebedev, which has been reprinted and translated into numerous languages. He also wrote the preface of the biography of Konstantin Tsiolkovsky in the ZhZL series, in 1962.

1990s — The circulation of books was sharply reduced, with many series being discontinued.

2000s — A gradual process of reviving the activities of the publishing house was started.

In 2009, the ZhZL: Small Series was launched, which differs from the classic ZhZL series only in the volume of the material.

Book series 
 The Lives of Remarkable People (ZhZL)
 The Lives of Remarkable People: The Biography Continues...
 The Lives of Remarkable People: Small Series
 Living History: The Daily Life of Humanity
 You're On the Road, Romantic
 Library of Modern Fiction
 A Close Past
 Case Number...
 Russia and the World
 Century Prose
 Golden Giraffe
 Arrow
 Literary Solitaire
 Pioneer - Means First
 Sport and Personality
 Eureka

Awards and prizes 
 Order of the Red Banner of Labour (1969)
 Lenin Komsomol Prize (1978)

References

External links 

 Official website

1922 establishments in Russia
Publishing companies established in 1922
Book publishing companies of Russia
Book publishing companies based in Moscow
Publishing companies of the Soviet Union
Recipients of the Lenin Komsomol Prize